The International Cotton Advisory Committee (ICAC) is an association of governments of cotton producing, consuming and trading countries which acts as the international commodity body for cotton and cotton textiles.

Structure and history
Founded at the International Cotton Meeting in Washington, DC in 1939, the ICAC advocates for cotton producing nations, publishes studies and technical information on the cotton industry, and holds an annual Plenary Meeting of member states. While most of the world's cotton producing nations are members, two of the ten largest producers (The People's Republic of China and Turkmenistan) are not members of the ICAC.  All of the top five cotton exporting nations are members.

The International Cotton Advisory Committee (ICAC) along with private sector cotton organizations initiated the International Forum for Cotton Promotion (IFCP) in 2000. The IFCP serves as a forum and clearinghouse for the exchange of proven cotton promotion techniques. The IFCP facilitates domestically focused and domestically funded cotton promotion programs.

Member states
Member nations and date joining:
      May 1946
      May 1946
      February 1917
         September 1939
   October 1997
        August 1969
            March 1967
  August 1973
          September 1939
  May  2017
         Sept 1939
      Sept 2006
         July 2007
  (Republic of Korea)          Mar 1954
            July 1996
       Sept 2010
          Sept 1972
         Jul 1948
 		Feb 1962 (as USSR: Sept 1939)        
     July 1991
            Sept 1939
      Jan 1951
           Feb 1963
             Sept 1999
           Nov 1947
           Nov 1962
   Sept 1939
       Sept 1992
         Apr 1991

See also
Cotton: The international cotton trade
Textile manufacturing- Machine processing of cotton
International Year of Natural Fibres

References

A Profile of the ICAC, icac.org

Organizations established in 1939
International economic organizations
1939 establishments in Washington, D.C.